The Gang's All Here is the sixth studio album by American heavy metal band Skid Row, released on October 14, 2022. It is the band's first release with new lead singer Erik Grönwall who replaced ZP Theart in March 2022, and is the band's first studio album in sixteen years since Revolutions per Minute in 2006.

Background and recording
The album was recorded in Nashville, Tennessee and produced by Nick Raskulinecz.

Release and promotion
The title track was released as the lead single and featured a music video which was released on May 25, 2022. The clip features live footage and photos taken and submitted by fans during the band's early 2022 concerts, as well as behind-the-scene footage showing the band rehearsing in the studio and backstage.

The band released the official music video for the second single "Tear It Down" in July 2022. The song is about breaking down barriers and the video was produced by Take 2 Productions / Rosey Media.

In September 2022, Skid Row released the third single "Time Bomb". The music video for the song was released on September 28, and featured director
Dale Resteghini, whom Rachel Bolan sought out to realize his artistic vision for the song about humanity's continuing struggles with monotony and self-indulgence.

Following the album's release the band released the single and lyric video for "October's Song" in the first week of November 2022, celebrating the worldwide chart success of the album.

Track listing

Personnel
Skid Row
Rachel Bolan – bass, backing vocals
Dave Sabo – lead & rhythm guitar, backing vocals
Scotti Hill – lead & rhythm guitar, backing vocals
Rob Hammersmith – drums, backing vocals
Erik Grönwall – lead vocals

Production
Nick Raskulinecz – production, engineering, mixing

Charts

References

External links

Skid Row (American band) albums
2022 albums
Albums produced by Nick Raskulinecz